The North Wing Sport X2 is an American ultralight trike, designed and produced by North Wing Design of Chelan, Washington. The aircraft is supplied as a kit for amateur construction or as a complete ready-to-fly-aircraft.

Design and development
The X2 was designed to comply with the Fédération Aéronautique Internationale microlight category and the US light-sport aircraft rules. It is listed on the Federal Aviation Administration's list of accepted SLSAs.

The X2 features a strut-braced hang glider-style high-wing, weight-shift controls, a two-seats-in-tandem open cockpit with a cockpit fairing, tricycle landing gear with wheel pants and a single engine in pusher configuration.

The aircraft is made from bolted-together aluminum tubing, with its double surface wing covered in Dacron sailcloth. Its  span wing is supported by struts and uses an "A" frame weight-shift control bar. The SLSA's powerplant is a twin cylinder, liquid-cooled, two-stroke, dual-ignition  Rotax 582 engine. Other engines are available for the kit-built versions, including the four cylinder, air and liquid-cooled, four-stroke, dual-ignition  Rotax 912UL and the  HKS 700E engine.

A number of different wings can be fitted to the basic carriage, including the North Wing Apache 3 or the North Wing Quest GT5. The North Wing M-Pulse 2 was formerly the standard wing.

Variants
Sport X2 Apache
Fully equipped version
Sport X2 Navajo
Minimally equipped version

Specifications (Sport X2 Apache)

References

External links

Sport
2000s United States sport aircraft
2000s United States ultralight aircraft
Single-engined pusher aircraft
Homebuilt aircraft
Ultralight trikes